Glam God with Vivica A. Fox is an American reality television show hosted by Vivica A. Fox. The series aired on VH1 from August to October 2008.

Overview
In the series, twelve contestants compete to become the next "Glam God". A Glam God is a stylist who gets their clients on the best dressed.

The winner of Glam God Season 1 was Indashio.

The Glam Squad
 Vivica A. Fox - Red Carpet Diva
 Melanie Bromley "British Invasion" - US Magazine Editor
 Phillip Bloch - Glam God

Contestants

Elimination Progress

  The stylist was selected as one of the top entries in the Elimination Challenge, but did not win.
 The stylist was selected on Challenge and was out of the competition.
 This stylist was in next round

* - This victory was Preston and Tigerlily and Team Jess and Handry.

Episode summary

Episode 1: "Who Wore It Best" 
The groups were as follows:

Jess, Aaron, Bo
Tigerlily, Indashio, Genelle
Chris, Coxy, Handry
Joachim, Matt, Preston

Winners: Tigerlily, Indashio, Genelle
Eliminated: Coxy, Aaron

Episode 2: "What they Thinking?"
The hot trend challenge was to style an outfit for actress Aimee Garcia. The winning group would have their design worn by Garcia at a red carpet event.

Preston, Handry
Joachim, Jess
Matt, Indashio
Tigerlily, Christopher
Genelle, Bo

Winners: Preston, Handry
Eliminated: Genelle

Joachim, Indashio, Handry
Jess, Chris, Preston
Matt, Tigerlily, Bo

Winners: Jess, Chris, Preston
Eliminated: Matt
Guest Judge: A Cursive Memory

Episode 3

Episode 4: "Low Life in High Heels"
The challenge started with the teams designing a look for a starlet to wear. They had to salvage her look after she exits a nightclub with the paparazzi watching her every move. Joachim's drinking embarrasses the team.

Eliminated: Joachim

Episode 5: "Growing Pains"
The stylists got a wake up call that is a blast from the past. They must take a signature item from the past and revolutionize it to current style.

Episode 6

Episode 7

Episode 8

References

External links

 

2008 American television series debuts
2008 American television series endings
2000s American reality television series
English-language television shows
Fashion-themed reality television series
VH1 original programming